Mohd Bunyamin bin Umar (born 7 January 1988) is a retired Malaysian professional footballer.

Bunyamin is a former member of the Malaysia National, Malaysia U-23 and a former member of the Malaysia U-20 squad. He also was the team captain of Selangor F.C. for the 2014 season.

International career
Bunyamin made his Malaysia debut in 2005. One of his matches as a Malaysia U-23 player was against Bahrain in the World Cup 2010 qualifying round after being sent on as a substitute by coach B. Sathianathan on 32 minutes. He then scored his first senior goal in added time in the first half and Malaysia's only goal in the 4–1 defeat to Bahrain.

He was the captain of Malaysia U-19 that competed in the 2007 Champions Youth Cup in Malaysia. He was given a trial for the Chelsea reserve team which lasted for two weeks.

Career statistics

Club

International

Outside football
Bunyamin earned a degree in bachelor's degree Human Resource Development from UPM in 2012 alongside teammate, Mahali Jasuli they are the examples for national footballer to further their education and having some backup plan if their pro career ended someday.

International goals

References

External links
 

1988 births
Malaysian footballers
Kedah Darul Aman F.C. players
Malaysia international footballers
Living people
People from Kedah
UPB-MyTeam FC players
Selangor FA players
Malaysia Super League players
Association football defenders
Association football midfielders